Seattle Sounders FC is an American soccer club founded in 2008, after the city of Seattle was awarded a Major League Soccer (MLS) franchise. The club began playing competitive soccer in the 2009 Major League Soccer season. It plays its home games at Lumen Field, competing in the Western Conference of the MLS. The current Sounders FC is the third soccer team from Seattle to bear the Sounders nickname. The tradition was started by Seattle's North American Soccer League team in 1974, and continued by the city's United Soccer Leagues side, formed in 1994. The current Sounders FC is an entity distinct to both of these clubs, and played its first MLS game on March 19, 2009, against the New York Red Bulls.

The Sounders record against each club faced in competitive matches, both domestically and internationally, are listed below. As of the 2023 season, there have been six different competitive competitions the Sounders have competed in. These include the MLS regular season, the MLS Cup Playoffs, the U.S. Open Cup, the Leagues Cup, the CONCACAF Champions League, and the FIFA Club World Cup.

Table key

Major League Soccer

U.S. Open Cup

The Sounders began their first U.S. Open Cup campaign as a Major League Soccer team in April 2009. The club went on to advance to the final, where they faced D.C. United at RFK Stadium. Two second half goals from Fredy Montero and Roger Levesque won the game 2–1 for Seattle as the club became the second expansion team in MLS history to win the tournament in their inaugural season.

Champions League

The Sounders made their first appearance in the CONCACAF Champions League in only their second season after winning the 2009 U.S. Open Cup. Their first game took place at CenturyLink Field in the preliminary round on July 28, 2010, against Isidro Metapán of El Salvador. The club won the game 1–0, with Fredy Montero scoring the decisive goal. They drew the return match 1–1 to advance to the group stage 2–1 on aggregate.

International friendlies

World Football Challenge

Footnotes
A : Includes matches played in the MLS Cup Playoffs and MLS Cup. All results are referenced to ESPN Soccernet, and RSSSF.
B : Includes qualification matches. All results are referenced to United States Soccer Federation, and RSSSF.
C :  Includes preliminary round matches. All results are references to ESPN Soccernet, and RSSSF.

References

Seattle Sounders FC
American soccer clubs records and statistics